Olga Yurevna Batalina (born November 8, 1975, in Saratov) is a Russian politician of the United Russia party. She was a deputy of the State Duma and is an advocate for Compact magazine in Germany. She is known for her stance against homosexuality in Russia.

References 

1975 births
Living people
Politicians from Saratov
Recipients of the Medal of the Order "For Merit to the Fatherland" II class
United Russia politicians
21st-century Russian women politicians
Sixth convocation members of the State Duma (Russian Federation)
Seventh convocation members of the State Duma (Russian Federation)
Eighth convocation members of the State Duma (Russian Federation)